Jordan Battle (born December 14, 2000) is an American football strong safety for the Alabama Crimson Tide.

Early years
Battle attended St. Thomas Aquinas High School in Fort Lauderdale, Florida. As a senior he had 27 tackles, three interceptions and a sack. He played in the 2019 Under Armour All-America Game. He originally committed to play college football at Ohio State University but changed his commitment to the University of Alabama.

College career
Battle played in 13 games and made four starts as a freshman in 2019. He had 30 tackles, one interception and one sack. Battle returned his sophomore year in 2020 as a starter. Battle was ejected from the 2021 College Football Playoff National Championship game for targeting.

References

External links

Alabama Crimson Tide bio

2000 births
Living people
Alabama Crimson Tide football players
American football safeties
Players of American football from Fort Lauderdale, Florida
St. Thomas Aquinas High School (Florida) alumni